Willie Allen may refer to:

Willie Allen (basketball) (born 1949), American basketball player and director of the Growing Power urban farming program
Willie Allen (racing driver) (born 1980), racing driver
Willie Mae Allen (born 1937), American community activist and politician

See also
William Allen (disambiguation)
Will Allen (disambiguation)
Bill Allen (disambiguation)
Allen (surname)